The term "Freshman 15" is an expression commonly used in the United States and Canada that refers to an amount (somewhat arbitrarily set at 15 pounds (6.8 kg), and originally just 10 lbs (4.5 kg)) of weight gained during a student's first year at college. In Australia and New Zealand, it is sometimes referred to as "First Year Fatties", "Fresher Spread", or "Fresher Five", the latter referring to a five-kilogram gain.

The purported causes of this weight gain are increased alcohol intake and the consumption of fat and carbohydrate-rich cafeteria-style food in university dormitories and fast food in nearby restaurants. Many other causes include malnutrition, stress, and decreased levels of exercise. All of these factors can affect each person in a different way. Studies have confirmed many of these causes. Some colleges and universities are taking steps to promote healthy eating habits and physical activity among their students in order to address the issue of accelerated weight gain.

Freshman 15 debunked 
Despite how commonly the Freshman 15 is asserted, a study from the Ohio State University showed that the average college student gains only two pounds (for women) to three pounds (for men) (1 and 1.5 kg respectively) in their first year. Additionally, it showed that the gain was only a half pound (around 200 grams) more than non-college students of the same age, and that the only factor that increased weight gain was heavy drinking.

Another study conducted by the National Center for Biotechnology Information (a subsidiary of the National Institutes of Health) found that on average, college freshman only gained 2.7 pounds. Additionally, only half of the students surveyed gained weight, and 15% of the students lost weight.

Over-eating

College meal plans
College meal plans are designed to give students a narrow variety of options. The most extravagant meal plans include a set amount of meals per day, so many per week, or so many per semester. In addition, plans may include little money that can be spent on snacks or other meals. Students can eat several meals a day or less than three meals a day. The meal plan was designed to benefit the student but it can be abused.

Dining halls

The dining halls at colleges try to make dining at school convenient and comfortable. Dining halls can provide a wide variety and bountiful options of food. They can also provide a place where students can endlessly indulge in high calorie foods such as pizza, fried food, and ice cream. When exposed to these meal locations, students are generally more likely to choose them over healthier options, which leads to weight gain, especially if fast food restaurants are more prevalent on campus than other restaurants. A study done on 60 students at Cornell University showed that 20% of the weight gained by the test subjects was directly caused by the dining halls' all-you-can-eat nature.

Eating habits
College dining halls appeal to some students and repulse others, which is especially problematic in the first year. A study published in the Journal of Adolescent Health determined that “regular family meals provide an opportunity for the role modeling of healthy eating patterns and social interactions among family members, and may thus help to reinforce healthy eating patterns and prevent disordered eating behaviors.” Thus, parents determine when, where, what and how their children eat. Away from home, often for the first time, students have no parental monitoring of their eating habits and have to (re)discover what good eating patterns are.

In parental-supervised eating, teenagers typically ingest the proper amount of calories. According to a calorie counter used at the Baylor College of Medicine, an average 18-year-old-male who is rarely active needs to consume approximately 2676 calories per day to maintain his weight. Similarly, an average 18-year-old female who is rarely active needs to consume approximately 1940 calories per day to maintain her weight.

In parental-supervised diets, students also usually ingest the proper proportion of foods from the different dietary groups; once removed from the parental dinner table, many college students do not eat enough fruits, vegetables, and dairy products. This is because when students go off to college, they face an independence that they usually have not experienced before. Many have to learn how to go out and feed themselves instead of having their parents cook for them. Research has shown that over 60 percent of college students commonly ingest sugary and fatty foods like chocolate and potato chips over fruits and vegetables. Presently, sugar accounts for approximately 20 percent of an American’s diet, which equates to about 90 pounds of sugar per person per year. This explains why a study, conducted by Stephanie Goodwin of Virginia Polytechnic Institute, states that three out of four students don’t eat at least five servings of fruits and vegetables daily, denying students key vitamins C and E, as well as fiber.

Malnutrition

Causes
Malnutrition can be caused by a number of things including inadequate or unbalanced diet, problems with digestion or absorption, or certain medical conditions.  Hunger is a main cause of malnutrition because if it is not satisfied then malnutrition is sure to follow.  People suffer from hunger because of a lack of food and the nutrients which accompany food in the short term. If hunger proceeds for an extended period of time there is a good chance that it will lead to malnutrition.
Malnutrition can affect people of every age. Though infants, children, and adolescents suffer more from malnutrition because of their need for critical nutrients for their normal development, older people may have problems because of aging or illness. People of college age have issues with malnutrition as well, though it may not be as severe as with the younger kids or the elderly.
In people in their undergraduate years of study at a four-year university, malnutrition can occur due to negligence of eating and even their diet.

Other causes

Students sometimes eat to deal with the pressures of stress. Stress may come from the pressures of unclear assignments, homework, and the transition from high school to college. Students entering college also may be making independent decisions about their diet, activity, and television viewing behaviors for the first time. New environmental and social factors might emerge during this time period and have a greater influence on students' behavior. When a student is stressed, the stress hormone cortisol is released, which can cause excessive eating.

Social pressures also play a factor with college student's eating habits. If an individual is trying to diet, it can become difficult to stick to a diet when going out with friends to a restaurant or eating at the dining hall. One study (Pliner et al., 2007) found that social pressures have a powerful effect on how we eat. According to the researchers, individuals will often eat the same amount as those around them, especially when they are in a small group. This finding implies that when we eat, it is not as simple as eating until we feel full. Rather, we might under-eat or overeat depending on the company we are in. This suggests that we may eat similar types of food to those around us, making others’ unhealthy choices our own. Much of this also comes from the transition from living at home to living on their own, which results in students not knowing how to properly eat on their own. 

Most college students' activity levels significantly decrease over the course of college. This results in weight gain because students do not workout as much and become lazier in everyday tasks. Transitioning into college is the first time when students have to learn how to maintain a healthy lifestyle and manage time in their schedules for physical activity.

College diet
College students must deal with many different changes in living conditions when it comes to dining.  In addition, some college students consume a lot of alcoholic beverages. The vitamins and minerals consumed from alcohol and from food consumed with alcohol have a good chance of being unabsorbed.  People who drink large quantities of alcohol may become malnourished or lose an unhealthy amount of weight due to the absorption blocking qualities of alcohol. Others gain weight from drinking alcohol due to the high caloric content of some alcoholic beverages.

Alcohol consumption

Nutrition
The body has a certain number of calories that it needs to consume in order to maintain its weight.  This is determined through height, weight, age, and several other factors, which differs from person to person.  When a person takes in more or fewer calories than that set limit, weight is either gained or lost.  Alcohol provides a large amount of calories in a small quantity of liquid, which tends to lead to unwanted extra calories.

When drinking alcohol on a regular basis, certain vitamin and mineral deficiencies can follow.  Examples of these deficiencies are as follows:

Folate: Folate helps to create and maintain new cells.  Alcohol interferes with the intake, absorption, transport, storage, and release of folate.
Vitamin B12: Vitamin B12 is required to make DNA and maintain healthy nerve and red blood cells.  Alcohol has been shown to decrease the levels of B12.
Vitamin A: Vitamin A is needed for vision, regulation of the immune system, bone growth, reproduction, cell division, and differentiation.  Alcohol decreases the levels of this vitamin and increases toxicity when alcohol is consumed in large amounts.
Calcium: Calcium is needed for blood vessel and muscle movement, for the secretions of certain hormones and enzymes, and for sending messages through the nervous system.  Consumption of alcohol can cause a loss of calcium through urinary excretion.

These deficiencies can lead to weight issues caused by malnutrition.  When consuming alcohol, these vitamins and minerals must be replaced.  Often this is how certain cravings arise.

About 1 in 4 college students report academic consequences from drinking, including missing classes, falling behind, doing poorly on exams, and overall receiving lower grade.

Students who are involved in fraternities and sororities in college tend to have the highest alcohol consumption rates.

Researchers have found that those who consumed drinks of higher alcohol strength, ate significantly more than the others. Not only that, but they also chose to eat more fatty and salty foods. They also found that urges to snack were much higher among drinkers. Drinking alcohol also increases the body fat percentage.

Unhealthy foods with alcohol

According to the National Institute on Alcohol Abuse and Alcoholism's research, people who tend to drink the largest amount of alcohol have the poorest eating habits compared to those who do not consume much alcohol at all. Those who do not drink a large quantity of alcohol seem to have the best quality diets. In this study researchers compared the Healthy Eating scores of 3,000 participants in the National Health and Nutrition Examination Survey with their overall consumption of alcohol. They used frequency, quantity, and average daily volume to measure the alcohol consumption.

The researchers found that as the alcohol quantity increased, the Health Index scores declined. As the frequency of alcohol consumed increased, the Healthy Eating scored declined. Diet quality was the poorest among those who consumed the largest quantity of alcohol. Care packages filled with unhealthy treats, sent usually by parents, is found to be the leading cause of weight gain. Those who drank less alcohol in an infrequent time frame had the best health index scores overall.

Stress and night eating
It is usual for college students, especially freshmen, to experience abnormal levels of stress. This is more prevalent for freshmen because they are still transitioning from high school. College students can hold jobs while taking classes and may feel they have no time for studying, while freshmen might be stressed just trying to adjust to the college work load. There are hundreds of reasons for why college students get stressed, but, whatever the reason, it also can lead to weight gain. This is because when the body is stressed, it releases hormones such as adrenaline or more importantly cortisol. Cortisol has been tested to slow down the body's metabolism. Other studies have shown that when people are stressed, they have cravings for foods that are high in calories such as sweet, salty, and processed foods.  Not only do people crave bad food when they are nervous or stressed, but they eat large quantities of it through continuous snacking even though they might not be hungry.  Therefore, an increase in weight can be seen in freshmen students even though they are eating normally.

A study done by Jatturong R. Wichianson and colleagues at the University of Southern California showed a direct relationship between eating late at night (Night eating syndrome) and stress levels with college students. They used a standardized test to measure both the levels of NES and perceived stress each student had. The results showed that students that had higher levels of stress were more likely to have NES due to the inability to adapt. This study shows that students who were not able to deal with stress appropriately were more likely to use late night eating to solve their issues.

Body image

Many college students struggle with body image issues at some point. College students being happy with their body image is hard to maintain due to the stress and comparisons of other college students. Body image in college students is of great concern because body dissatisfaction is one of the most consistent risk factors for eating disorders and is a significant predictor of low self-esteem, depression, and obesity. Eating disorders typically begin between the ages of 18 and 21. The two most common eating disorders are anorexia and bulimia. Anorexia deals with a person’s refusal to gain weight, disturbance of body image and the inability to maintain a certain weight. Bulimia is generally eating large amounts of food in a short period of time, usually within a span of two hours, then trying to get rid of the food by various methods; purging, laxatives or over-exercising. The idea of the "Freshman 15" makes students think that it is impossible to avoid when going to college. This is what develops eating disorders because students feel the need to be thin and skinny in order to avoid the "Freshman 15" weight gain. Statistics show that 91 percent of women attempt to control their weight by dieting.

Body image is especially more popular with women. Currently, beautiful is considered good and thinness is synonymous with beauty, which makes it valued by society while its opposite, obesity, is strongly rejected. Although the ideals of female beauty vary as a function of aesthetic standards adopted at each time, studies show that women have tried to change their bodies to follow these standards. Young women’s body image is greatly influenced by how they believed their friends and peers judged their bodies.

Developmental and social changes that may impact body image include: Physical and emotional separation from family, requirements for high academic performance, and transitions such as moving from home to residence hall.

By gender
Nicole L. Mihalopoulos and colleagues developed a study at a private university in the Northeastern United States.  Their goal was to determine if college students did truly gain weight in their freshmen year. Test subjects were made up of male and female freshmen college students who lived on campus. They took an online survey to answer questions about their eating patterns, social behaviors, as well as weight. The purpose of this was to discover if the individuals showed signs of body image issues or eating disorders.

125 freshmen were eligible for testing and the average age was 18.4. The results showed that about half of the test subjects gained weight. The men gained an average of 3.7 lbs and women gained an average of 1.7 lbs their freshmen year. These results disproved their hypothesis that the women would have a larger weight gain than the men, but this stays consistent with other studies done on the hypothesis. Even though only 5% of the test subjects showed a weight gain of 15 lbs or greater the authors of this study concluded that the freshmen year in college has potential for weight gain and can even lead to obesity later on in life.

References

Bibliography

External links
 List of causes of the Freshman 15
 University of Guelph research finds that the actual gain is less
 CNN article reflecting this phenomenon

Human body weight
Student culture
Academic meals